Jorge Rivero (born Jorge Pous Rosas; June 15, 1938) is a Mexican actor, with a career spanning two continents (America and Europe), primarily in Spanish-language media. He has been also credited as George Rivers and George Rivero.

Early life 
Rivero was raised in Mexico City and proved to be an excellent athlete,[3] excelling in track, jai alai and water polo.[4] At an early age, he became a bodybuilder[5] and has used weightlifting to maintain his physique throughout his life. Graduating from Colegio Universitario Mexicano in 1960 with a degree in chemical engineering, Rivero then became an actor.

Acting roles

For Rivero's first film, he was cast in René Cardona's movie The Invisible Assassin (1965) where he wears a mask throughout the film. His breakthrough role came in El Mexicano (1966; directed by René Cardona), making him a star overnight in Mexico. This movie was followed by Pistoleros de la frontera (1967). He appeared in wrestling films with Santo in Operación 67 (1967) and  El Tesoro de Moctezuma (1968).

Rivero's most notorious role came in The Sin of Adam and Eve (El pecado de Adán y Eva) (1969), in which Rivero and American costar Candy Wilson appear nude throughout most of the film. By 1970, Rivero had offers from Hollywood and acted in the big-budget films Soldier Blue (1970; with Candice Bergen and Donald Pleasence), Rio Lobo (1970; with John Wayne and Jennifer O'Neill) and The Last Hard Men (1976; with Charlton Heston and James Coburn). Afterward, Rivero continued to act in Mexican, Italian and U.S. productions, including appearances in Lucio Fulci's 1983 fantasy film Conquest and the all-star action film Counterforce in 1988.

In 1996, Rivero acted in the film Werewolf with Richard Lynch and Joe Estevez.

Selected filmography

 Neutron Traps the Invisible Killers (1965)
 Pedro Páramo (1967)
 Operation 67 (1967)
The Sin of Adam and Eve (1969)
La hermana dinamita (1969)
Soldier Blue (1970)
Rio Lobo (1970)
Bellas de noche (1975)
The Last Hard Men (1976)
Centennial (TV, 1978)
 Carnival Nights (1978)
Manaos (1979)
 Midnight Dolls (1979)
Day of the Assassin (1979)
 The Loving Ones (1979)
 The Pulque Tavern (1981)
Priest of Love (1981)
Hit Man (1982)
Conquest (1983)
 (1984)
Killing Machine (1984)
Counterforce (1988)
Werewolf (1996)

Notes

External links

1938 births
Mexican people of Spanish descent
Mexican people of Catalan descent
Mexican male telenovela actors
Mexican male film actors
Male actors from Guadalajara, Jalisco
20th-century Mexican male actors
21st-century Mexican male actors
Living people